Carolina is a city and municipality located on the northeast coast of Puerto Rico. It lies immediately east of the capital San Juan and Trujillo Alto; north of Gurabo and Juncos; and west of Canóvanas and Loíza. Carolina is spread over 12 barrios plus Carolina Pueblo (the downtown area and administrative center). It is part of the San Juan-Caguas-Guaynabo Metropolitan Statistical Area, and home to Puerto Rico's main airport, the Luis Muñoz Marín International Airport.

History
The town was founded by Spanish colonists in 1816 as Trujillo Bajo ("lower Trujillo"), along with its counterpart Trujillo Alto after Trujillo, Spain. In 1857 it was renamed to San Fernando de la Carolina, later shortened to Carolina, after Charles II of Spain.

The city is known as "Tierra de Gigantes" (Land of Giants), not only for well-known Carolina resident Don Felipe Birriel González (who was 7'11"), but also in honor of other people from Carolina, including poet Julia de Burgos and most notably the first Latin American player named to baseball's Hall of Fame, Roberto Clemente. Carolina was also home to Jesús T. Piñero, the first Puerto Rican to be appointed as governor by the United States government.
The city is also known as "El Pueblo de los Tumba Brazos" (The Arm Hackers' Town). During the late 1800s, the town's major export was sugarcane.

Puerto Rico was ceded by Spain in the aftermath of the Spanish–American War under the terms of the Treaty of Paris of 1898 and became a territory of the United States. In 1899, the United States Department of War conducted a census of Puerto Rico finding that the population of Carolina was 11,965.

Hurricane Maria on September 20, 2017 caused flooding in Carolina. The Río Grande de Loíza floods left around 500 homes uninhabitable. The Roberto Clemente stadium lost its roof and many other structures, bridges and roads were damaged to a toll of $87 million. Given the Luis Muñoz Marín International Airport is in Carolina, the destruction in Carolina created a challenge and the airport remained closed for three days. Two weeks after, the airport was attempting to operate a more regular schedule, but electricity was inconsistent and on October 10, nearly a month after the hurricane the airport was running on generators again.

Geography
Carolina municipality has a number of rivers such as the Río Canovanillas, Río Grande de Loíza, La Torrecilla, Piñones Lagoons.

Barrios

Like all municipalities of Puerto Rico, Carolina is subdivided into barrios.

 Barrazas
 Buena Vista
 Cacao
 Cangrejo Arriba
 Canovanillas
Carolina barrio-pueblo
 Carruzos
 Cedro
 Martín González
 Sabana Abajo
 San Antón
 Santa Cruz
 Trujillo Bajo

Sectors
Barrios (which are like minor civil divisions) and subbarrios, in turn, are further subdivided into smaller local populated place areas/units called sectores (sectors in English). The types of sectores may vary, from normally sector to urbanización to reparto to barriada to residencial, among others.

Special Communities

 (Special Communities of Puerto Rico) are marginalized communities whose citizens are experiencing a certain amount of social exclusion. A map shows these communities occur in nearly every municipality of the commonwealth. Of the 742 places that were on the list in 2014, the following barrios, communities, sectors, or neighborhoods were in Carolina: Colo, Martín González, Buena Vista, Buenaventura, Canovanillas (Estancias del Parque), Cuesta Quiles, Eduardo J. Saldaña - La Cerámica, La Villas (Justicia y Esperanza), Sabana Abajo Norte, Sabana Abajo Sur, Saint Just, San Antón, and Villa Caridad.

Tourism

Carolina is one of Puerto Rico's most important tourist centers. Luis Muñoz Marín International Airport, the territory's main airport, is located in Isla Verde. Also located in Carolina are a large group of hotels, which sit by Carolina's large beach area of Isla Verde.

There are several well-known hotels on the coast of Carolina (Isla Verde area), including the El San Juan Resort and Casino, InterContinental San Juan Hotel and the Ritz-Carlton San Juan Hotel, Spa, and Casino. Isla Verde has an Orthodox Jewish synagogue, Chabad of Puerto Rico, the only Orthodox Jewish synagogue in Puerto Rico, which serves the island's Jewish residents and visiting tourists.

Landmarks and places of interest
There are 4 beaches in Carolina, including .
Buena Vista Ruins
Carolina Beach
Loíza's Big River
Isla Verde Club Gallístico
Luis Muñoz Marín International Airport
Jesús T. Piñero Monument
Julia de Burgos Park
Piñones Beach
Roberto Clemente Ciudad Deportiva

Economy
Carolina is the home of Plaza Carolina, one of Puerto Rico's largest shopping malls.

Executive Airlines, an aircraft ground handling company and subsidiary of American Airlines, is headquartered on the grounds of Luis Muñoz Marín International Airport in Carolina.

Industrial
Manufacturing (pharmaceutical, medical equipment and chemical) and commerce.

Culture

Festivals and events
Carolina celebrates its patron saint festival in late May / early June. The  is a religious and cultural celebration that generally features parades, games, artisans, amusement rides, regional food, and live entertainment.

Other festivals and events celebrated in Carolina include:
 Jazz Night – third Friday of the month
 Bohemia Night – second Thursday of the month
 Youth Night – first Friday every two months
 Artisans' Market – one Sunday a month
 Roberto Clemente Week – August

Sports
In recent years, Carolina has seen the building of the Ciudad Deportiva Roberto Clemente or Roberto Clemente Sports City, a sports and recreation facility that aims to become a youth sports school, and the Roberto Clemente Stadium, host to many entertainment events and to the 2003 and 2007 Caribbean World Series. It has also played host to the Coliseo Guillermo Angulo, where the BSN's Gigantes de Carolina play, as well as the Gigantes of Puerto Rican women's professional basketball, the Gigantes of men's professional volleyball, and the Gigantes of women's professional volleyball.

The Gigantes de Carolina professional baseball team use the Roberto Clemente Stadium as their home field. There is also another team with the same name, the Giants de Carolina, a professional soccer team that plays in the Puerto Rico Soccer League. That team also uses the Roberto Clemente Stadium as its home field.

Professional horse jockey Emanuel Jose Sanchez was born in Carolina. Riding the mare Mark Me Special he captured the 7th race at Colonial Downs on June 19, 2005.

Puerto Rico was ceded by Spain in the aftermath of the Spanish–American War under the terms of the Treaty of Paris of 1898 and became a territory of the United States. In 1899, the United States conducted its first census of Puerto Rico finding that the population of Carolina was 11,965.

Demographics
Puerto Rico was ceded by Spain in the aftermath of the Spanish–American War under the terms of the Treaty of Paris of 1898 and became a territory of the United States. In 1899, the United States conducted its first census of Puerto Rico finding that the population of Carolina was 11,965.

Government

All municipalities in Puerto Rico are administered by a mayor, elected every four years. The current mayor of Carolina is José Aponte Dalmau, of the Popular Democratic Party (PPD). He was elected in 2007, after a special election, succeeding his late father, José Aponte de la Torre. Aponte de la Torre was elected mayor in 1984 and served for 23 years.

The city belongs to the Puerto Rico Senatorial district VIII, which is represented by two Senators. In 2012, Pedro A. Rodríguez and Luis Daniel Rivera were elected as District Senators.

The Carolina Police Department, with most of its precincts in the northern half of the city due to the density of the population, handle law enforcement responsibilities. Puerto Rico Police Department also has jurisdiction in Carolina, especially for narcotics enforcement, with four precincts positioned on all four points of the city.

Carolina created the first municipal fire department in Puerto Rico. The Carolina Fire Department in collaboration with the Carolina Municipal Emergency Management use two engine trucks, one ladder track and one special hazard engine truck. Their headquarters are located in the tourist district of Isla Verde. Also, the Puerto Rico Fire Department have a fire station and regional office in town, located on the Roberto Clemente Avenue.

Transportation 
There are 72 bridges in Carolina. The Teodoro Moscoso Bridge connects Carolina to San Juan. Luis Muñoz Marin International Airport is located in Carolina.

Symbols
The  has an official flag and coat of arms.

Flag
The flag consists of three vertical bands, the laterals white and the middle red. The laterals are seeded with black ermine tails in the heraldic way as for the coat of arms. The middle band of the flag shows a red field with the sword and crown of the coat of arms.

Coat of arms
The crown over the sword is the main attribute for royalty and for that reason it occupies a privileged position in the coat of arms. The sword is not only a symbol for military service, but also one of justice, recalling the virtues of San Fernando. The coat of arms has a wide edge of silver, a cultivated field of small tails of ermine shown in the conventional heraldic manner. The red symbolizes the first patriotic developments made for Puerto Rico's freedom under Spanish dominion.

Notable people from Carolina

Gallery

See also

List of Puerto Ricans
History of Puerto Rico

References

 Carolina and its barrios, United States Census Bureau

Books
Carolina, Puerto Rico: Land of Giants (2012) by Greg Boudonck and Maria Ruiz O'Farrill

External links
 Puerto Rico Government Directory 

 
Municipalities of Puerto Rico
San Juan–Caguas–Guaynabo metropolitan area
Populated places established in 1816
1816 establishments in the Spanish Empire